Honorius has been the name of four Roman Catholic Popes and one Antipope.  The name is of Latin origin, derived from honōrō ("honor, respect").

Pope Honorius I (625–638)
Antipope Honorius II (1061–1072)
Pope Honorius II (1124–1130)
Pope Honorius III (1216–1227)
Pope Honorius IV (1285–1287)

Honorius